Death Won't Send A Letter is an album by Cory Chisel and The Wandering Sons. It was released in 2009.

Track listing

Cory Chisel and The Wandering Sons albums
2009 albums
Albums produced by Joe Chiccarelli